Welltris is a puzzle video game, developed by Doca and licensed to Bullet-Proof Software. It is an official game in the Tetris series. Adaptations were made by Sphere, Inc., for Spectrum HoloByte, and by Infogrames. It was released for MS-DOS compatible operating systems in 1989. Ports for Macintosh, Amiga, Amstrad CPC, and Atari ST followed 1990, then ZX Spectrum and Commodore 64 1991.

Gameplay
Welltris was the first Tetris sequel designed by original designer Alexey Pajitnov, with Andrei Sgenov. It retains that game's falling-block puzzle gameplay but extends the pit into three dimensions while the blocks remain two-dimensional, with the board viewed from above.

As blocks descend into the well, they can be rotated or moved left or right along the walls, from one wall to another if desired. Once a block reaches the floor, it will slide as far as possible until stopped by an edge or another piece. Whenever the player completes a solid horizontal or vertical line, it disappears and the remaining squares slide to fill the open space.

If a falling block comes to rest with any part of itself still on a wall, that wall is temporarily frozen; no blocks can be moved onto it during this time. Freezing all four walls ends the game.

Reception
In 1990, Dragon gave the Macintosh IIx version of the game 5 out of 5 stars. MacUser reviewed the Macintosh version of Welltris, praising the new playstyle as compared to its predecessor, and stating that "Welltris is both thoughtful and highly addictive." Macworld also reviewed the Mac version, praising its gameplay, music and graphics, summarizing their thoughts by stating "[Welltris] successfully extends the Tetris metaphor; cheery folk music and captivating scenes; very challenging." Macworld criticizes the steep learning curve and a point in the game where the speed of the falling pieces become unmanagable, referring to the latter as the "one annoying habit" that it shares with Tetris.

The ZX Spectrum version had mixed reviews, with CRASH awarding 79%, Sinclair User awarding 45% and Your Sinclair giving 79%. The actual gameplay and addictiveness were highlighted as good areas, but criticisms included the fiddly controls and minimal sound and looks.

The Commodore 64 version, with its more colourful graphics, received 80% from Zzap!64.

See also
3D Tetris
Blockout

References

External links

Welltris at World of Spectrum.
Welltris for the Amiga at Hall of Light.

Tetris
1989 video games
Alexey Pajitnov games
Amiga games
Amstrad CPC games
Arcade video games
Atari ST games
Blue Planet Software games
Commodore 64 games
DOS games
Classic Mac OS games
ZX Spectrum games
Spectrum HoloByte games
Soviet games
Video games developed in Russia
Single-player video games